Midt om natten is the fifth studio album by the Danish rock musician Kim Larsen. It was released in 1983. The album is the soundtrack to the film Midt om natten.

Track listing
All tracks by Kim Larsen, except where noted.
Side one
 "Susan himmelblå" - 3:50
 "Papirsklip" - 3:15
 "Haveje" (Jacob Haugaard) - 3:40
 "Rocco" - 3:05
 "Tik tik" - 4:45
Side two
 "Sköna flicka" (Kim Larsen, Henning Pold)  - 2:45
 "Tiden står stille" (Larsen, Mogens Mogensen, Wili Jønsson) - 4:00
 "1910" - 2:45
 "Lille pige" (Larsen, Søren Berlev) - 2:55
 "Volver volver" - 3:05
 "Midt om natten" - 4:30

Certifications and sales

References

1983 soundtrack albums
Kim Larsen albums